A street stocker, is a production based speedway car formula raced in every state in Australia. Most are old-style sedans which are cheap to build and maintain. The most competitive series is the Sydney Street Stocker Championship raced at Parramatta City Raceway.

Various speedway boards under the NASR (Australian Speedway National Board) run to their own rules, but they are similar. For example, an ASCF car could run in the RSA championship with minor modifications. Considered the backbone of Australian speedway racing, as it is easily affordable by many. Large fields are commonplace.

Some of the core rules are:
Sedans only  
No multiple overhead camshafts and only two valves per cylinder 
The vehicle must be in sound condition with all original panels used 
All glass and external mirrors must be removed along with any ornamentation and trim 
The radiator may be relocated inside the car subject to safety rules 
A maximum capacity 30 litre fuel tank must be fitted. The factory tank must be removed. 
Suspension modifications are allowed. Standard mounts must be used. 
The engine must be no larger than 274 ci. No V8s  or rotaries. 
No forced induction 
Internal engine modifications are allowed with restrictions 
One single or dual throat carburettor 
Wings are permitted within limits

List of ASCF national champions.

References

External links 
 Sydney Street Stockers
 Nowra Street stockers
 Restricted Sedan Association of NSW
 ASCF Street Stockers
 Australian Speedway Sedans

See also 

Oval track
Short track motor racing
Dirt track racing in Australia

Motorsport categories in Australia
Stock car racing